Amaranth is a reddish-rose color that is a representation of the color of the flower of the amaranth plant.  The color shown is the color of the red amaranth flower (the color normally considered amaranth), but there are other varieties of amaranth that have other colors of amaranth flowers; these colors are also shown below.

Description
The color amaranth is displayed at right. This color is also called amaranth red to distinguish it from the varying colors of other varieties of the amaranth flower.

The color amaranth is similar to printer's magenta (pigment magenta), but redder. It is the color of the flower of those amaranth plants that have amaranth red colored flowers.

The first recorded use of amaranth as a color name in English was in 1690.

Etymology 
The name amaranth comes from the Greek a (not) + marainean (to waste away), i.e., a flower believed to grow on Mount Olympus which never died.

Variations

Pink 

The color amaranth pink is displayed at right. This color is a representation of the color of pink amaranth flowers.

The first recorded use of amaranth pink as a color name in English was in 1905.

Bright
 
The Crayola crayon color radical red is displayed at right.

The color radical red, which may also be called bright amaranth pink, was formulated by Crayola in 1990.

This color is supposed to be fluorescent, but there is no mechanism for displaying fluorescence on a computer screen.

Purple 

The color amaranth purple is displayed at right. This color is a representation of the color of purple amaranth flowers.

The first recorded use of amaranth purple as a color name in English was in 1912.

Deep 

Amaranth deep purple is the tone of amaranth that is called amaranth in the 1930 book by Maerz and Paul A Dictionary of Color.

Alizarin 

Alizarin is the tone of amaranth that is called alizarin in the 1930 book by Maerz and Paul A Dictionary of Color.

See also

 Amaranth (dye)
 Cerise (color)
 Crimson
 List of colors
 Rose (color)
 Ruby (color)

References

External links
  Picture of purple amaranth flower
 Robert W. Freckmann Herbarium: Amaranthus cruentus L.:

Shades of pink
Shades of red